Frank E. Hull (1882–1968) was an American film editor. He spent many years working for Fox Film and MGM.

Selected filmography
 The Penalty (1920)
 Out of the Storm (1920)
 The Merry Widow (1925)
 The Wedding March (1928)
 The Awful Truth (1929)
 Up the River (1930)
 Born Reckless (1930)
 Seas Beneath (1931)
 Merely Mary Ann (1931)
 Hello, Sister! (1933)
 I Loved You Wednesday (1933)
 Student Tour (1934)
 Evelyn Prentice (1934)
 This Side of Heaven (1934)
 No More Ladies (1935)
 The Unguarded Hour (1936)
 Lord Jeff (1938)
 The Adventures of Huckleberry Finn (1939)
 The Secret of Dr. Kildare (1939)
 Thunder Afloat (1939)
 Florian (1940)
 Dulcy (1940)
 Come Live with Me (1941)
 Somewhere I'll Find You (1942)
 Nazi Agent (1942)
 Slightly Dangerous (1943)
 Maisie Goes to Reno (1944)
 Merton of the Movies (1947)

References

Bibliography 
 Solomon, Aubrey. The Fox Film Corporation, 1915-1935: A History and Filmography. McFarland, 2011.

External links 
 

1882 births
1968 deaths
People from Kansas
American film editors